The American heavy metal band Avenged Sevenfold have released seven studio albums, one soundtrack album, one live album, two compilation albums, 23 singles, two video albums and 28 music videos. Formed in Huntington Beach, California in 1999, the band originally featured vocalist M. Shadows (Matthew Sanders), guitarist Zacky Vengeance (Zachary Baker), bassist Matt Wendt and drummer The Rev (James Sullivan). Synyster Gates (Brian Haner Jr.) joined as lead guitarist in 2001, just after the group released their debut album Sounding the Seventh Trumpet on Good Life Recordings, which was later reissued on Hopeless Records.

After replacing Wendt with Justin Sane and later Dameon Ash, Avenged Sevenfold settled on Johnny Christ (Jonathan Seward) on bass in 2003 to record Waking the Fallen. The album was the band's first to chart in the US, reaching the top ten of the Billboard 200. It was certified platinum by the Recording Industry Association of America (RIAA). The 2005 follow-up City of Evil only reached number 30 on the chart, but was certified platinum by the RIAA. The single "Bat Country" reached the top ten of the US Billboard Alternative Songs and Mainstream Rock charts, while "Beast and the Harlot" topped the UK Rock & Metal Singles Chart.

In 2007 the band released its self-titled fourth album, which was the first to reach the top five of the Billboard 200 when it peaked at number 4. The All Excess video, released earlier in the year, topped the Billboard Music Video Sales chart and reached number 2 on the UK Music Video Chart. Avenged Sevenfold was the band's final full release to feature The Rev, who died of an accidental overdose of prescription drugs and alcohol on December 28, 2009, while they were producing their next album Nightmare. Mike Portnoy performed drums on 2010s Nightmare, which topped the Billboard 200 for the first time in the band's career. Lead single "Nightmare" topped the Billboard Heatseekers Songs chart, while third single "So Far Away" became the band's first to top the Mainstream Rock chart. 2011's "Not Ready to Die" topped the UK Rock & Metal Singles Chart.

Arin Ilejay joined as The Rev's second replacement in 2013, performing on the band's sixth studio album Hail to the King. The album followed Nightmare by topping the Billboard 200, as well as being the group's first release to reach number 1 on the Canadian and UK Albums Charts. "Hail to the King" and "Shepherd of Fire" both topped the Mainstream Rock chart. Brooks Wackerman replaced Ilejay in 2015, and the following year the band released The Stage without any prior announcement. The album reached number 4 on the Billboard 200 and topped the Canadian Albums Chart. Since 2017, the band has been adding to The Stage as part of an "evolving track listing", including cover versions of "God Only Knows" by The Beach Boys, "As Tears Go By" by The Rolling Stones and "Wish You Were Here" by Pink Floyd.

Avenged Sevenfold released Live at the Grammy Museum on December 8, 2017, documenting the group's first acoustic performance at the Grammy Museum in October.

Albums

Studio albums

Notes

Live albums

Compilations

Extended plays

Singles 

Notes

Promotional singles

Other charted songs

Other appearances

Videos

Video albums

Music videos

References

External links
Avenged Sevenfold official website
Avenged Sevenfold discography at AllMusic
Avenged Sevenfold discography at Discogs
Avenged Sevenfold discography at MusicBrainz

Discography
Avenged Sevenfold
Avenged Sevenfold
Heavy metal group discographies